Erigonoploides is a monotypic genus of Asian dwarf spiders containing the single species, Erigonoploides cardiratus. It was first described by K. Y. Eskov in 1989, and has only been found in Russia.

See also
 List of Linyphiidae species (A–H)

References

Linyphiidae
Monotypic Araneomorphae genera
Spiders of Russia